is a district divided between Rumoi and Sōya Subprefectures, Hokkaido, Japan.  At the end of 2009, the district has an estimated population of 13,937 and an area of 2039.11 km2, giving a population density of 6.83 persons per square kilometer.

In 2010, the town of Horonobe was transferred from Rumoi Subprefecture to Sōya Subprefecture.

Towns

Rumoi Subprefecture
Enbetsu
Teshio

Sōya Prefecture
Horonobe
Toyotomi

Districts in Hokkaido